Mildred Leonora Sanderson (May 12, 1889 – October 10, 1914) was an American  mathematician, best known for her mathematical theorem concerning modular invariants.

Life 
Sanderson was born in Waltham, Massachusetts, in 1889 and was the valedictorian of her class at the Waltham High School. She graduated from Mount Holyoke College in 1910, winning Senior Honors in Mathematics. She obtained her Ph.D degree from the University of Chicago in 1913, publishing the thesis  in which she set forth her mathematical theorem. She was Leonard Eugene Dickson's first female doctoral student.

After completing her Ph.D., Sanderson briefly taught at the University of Wisconsin before her untimely death in 1914 due to tuberculosis.

Sanderson's theorem

Sanderson's theorem  states:
"To any modular invariant  of a system of forms under any group  of linear transformations with coefficients in the field , there corresponds a formal invariant  under  such that  for all sets of values in the field of the coefficients of the system of forms." Often this theorem was cited as “Miss Sanderson’s Theorem”.

Recognition

Leonard Eugene Dickson (who Sanderson completed her Ph.D. under the direction of) wrote of her thesis, "This paper is a highly important contribution to this field of work; its importance lies partly in the fact that it establishes a correspondence between modular and formal invariants. Her main theorem has already been frequently quoted on account of its fundamental character. Her proof is a remarkable piece of mathematics."

Eric Temple Bell wrote, "Miss Sanderson's single contribution (1913) to modular invariants has been rated by competent judges as one of the classics of the subject."

A Mildred L. Sanderson prize for excellence in mathematics was established in her honor in 1939 at Mount Holyoke College.

She is mentioned in the 2008 book Pioneering women in American mathematics: the pre-1940 PhD's, by Judy Green and Jeanne LaDuke.

References 

1889 births
1914 deaths
People from Waltham, Massachusetts
Mount Holyoke College alumni
University of Chicago alumni
University of Wisconsin–Madison faculty
20th-century American mathematicians
20th-century deaths from tuberculosis
20th-century American women scientists
American women mathematicians
20th-century women mathematicians
Waltham High School alumni
Tuberculosis deaths in Massachusetts